The posterior interventricular sulcus or posterior longitudinal sulcus is one of the two grooves separating the ventricles of the heart (the other being the anterior interventricular sulcus). It is located on the diaphragmatic surface of the heart near the right margin. It extends between the coronary sulcus, and the (notch of) apex of the heart. It contains the posterior interventricular artery, and middle cardiac vein.

References

External links
 

Cardiac anatomy